Events in the year 1765 in India.

Events
National income - ₹9,571 million
Allahabad occupied by the British.

References

 
India
Years of the 18th century in India